Curiosity is an American documentary television series that premiered on August 7, 2011, on the Discovery Channel. Each episode focuses on one question in science, technology, and society (e.g., why the  sank) and, for the first season, features a different celebrity host. Stephen Hawking hosted the premiere episode titled "Did God Create the Universe?", which aired simultaneously on seven Discovery Communications networks: Discovery Channel, TLC, Discovery Fit and Health, Animal Planet, Science, Investigation Discovery, and Destination America. Season one consists of 16 episodes.

Curiosity: The Questions of Our Life
The development of "Curiosity: The Questions of Our Life", was announced in September 2009. It was to answer questions and mysteries in fields like space, biology, geology, medicine, physics, technology, nature, archaeology, history, and the human mind.  It was considered as a groundbreaking series for Discovery like the BBC's Planet Earth and Life. Originally, this series was to be a monthly show airing 12 one-hour episodes each year for 5 years beginning in January 2011. Dan Riskin was initially slated to host.

Curiosity.com 
The website was opened in June 2011. It was to be an expert Q&A site, where experts and scholars tried to answer some of life's most profound questions. The 32 topics in site ranges from biodiversity to nanotechnology. So far 12,000 questions have been answered. On November 11, 2014, Curiosity.com became independent of Discovery Communications.

CuriosityStream.com 
 
John Hendricks, founder of the Discovery Channel and creator of the original Curiosity brand, launched CuriosityStream on March 18, 2015.  An ad-free subscription video on demand platform for science and history documentaries, CuriosityStream is a continuation of Hendricks' vision for the original Curiosity TV series.  The service exclusively features documentaries and series in the areas of Science, Technology, Civilization and the Human Spirit as well as offers mobile viewing applications on iOS and Android devices.

Episodes

Series overview

Season 1: 2011

Season 2: 2012

References 

General references

External links 
 
 

Discovery Channel original programming
2011 American television series debuts
2013 American television series endings